The women's beach volleyball tournament at the 2022 Commonwealth Games will be held in Smithfield between 30 July and 7 August 2022.

Schedule
All times based on British Summer Time (UTC+01:00)

Qualification
Qualification for the tournament happened as follows:

Competition format
In June 2022, twelve pairs were drawn into three groups; the top two performing pairs in each group, plus the two best third-place pairs advance to the knockout stage.

Group stage

Pool A

Pool B

Pool C

Ranking of third-placed teams

Knockout stage

Quarterfinals

Semifinals

Bronze medal match

Gold medal match

References

women's